Tiedepolitiikka (Finnish: The Science Policy) is a Finnish language peer-reviewed scientific journal published four times a year. The publisher is the Edistyksellinen tiedeliitto (Finnish Association for Progressive Science). The journal focuses on the topics of science, higher education, research and technology. Kari Kuoppala is the editor-in-chief of Tiedepolitiikka which is based in Helsinki, Finland.

References

External links

1997 establishments in Finland
Magazines published in Helsinki
Policy analysis journals
Publications established in 1997
Quarterly journals
Science policy